Loreto Formation is a sedimentary formation of Late Eocene age in the southernmost Magallanes Basin. It overlies the Leña Dura Formation and the contact with an overlying formation is not observed.

Description 
The formation contains fossil wood, leaf imprints and palynomorphs. Also fossil fish of Striatolamia macrota and Ischyodus dolloi and indeterminate Spheniscidae fossils have been found in the formation.

The formation crops out in Brunswick Peninsula and Sierra Baguales among other places.

References

Bibliography 
 
 
 
 

Geologic formations of Chile
Eocene Series of South America
Paleogene Chile
Priabonian Stage
Divisaderan
Sandstone formations
Conglomerate formations
Coal formations
Coal in Chile
Paleontology in Chile
Shallow marine deposits
Formations
Geology of Magallanes Region
Geology of Tierra del Fuego